Dimitrios Kontodimos (born 21 April 1982) is a Greek professional football player, who last played for Panachaiki.

Career
On 5 July 2013 he signed for Greek Football League club Iraklis. He made his debut for his new club in an away 3–2 loss against Kavala. On July 9, 2014, he signed a one-year contract with his hometown club AE Larissa.

References

External links
Onsports.gr profile 
Guardian profile

1982 births
Living people
A.O. Kerkyra players
Athlitiki Enosi Larissa F.C. players
Xanthi F.C. players
Panionios F.C. players
Apollon Pontou FC players
Niki Volos F.C. players
Iraklis Thessaloniki F.C. players
Super League Greece players
Greek footballers
Association football fullbacks
Footballers from Larissa